Peter Götz is a German politician of the Christian Democratic Union (CDU) and former member of the German Bundestag.

Life 
Götz joined the CDU and Junge Union in 1974 and was a member of the executive board of the CDU Rastatt from 1974 to 1982. From 1990 to 2013 Götz was a member of the German Bundestag. There he was chairman of the working group on local politics and spokesman for local politics of the CDU/CSU parliamentary group since 1998.

References

External links 

1947 births
Living people
Members of the Bundestag for Baden-Württemberg
Members of the Bundestag 2009–2013
Members of the Bundestag 2005–2009
Members of the Bundestag 2002–2005
Members of the Bundestag 1998–2002
Members of the Bundestag 1994–1998
Members of the Bundestag 1990–1994
Members of the Bundestag for the Christian Democratic Union of Germany